Diano Arentino is a comune (municipality) in the Province of Imperia in the Italian region Liguria, located about  southwest of Genoa and about  north of Imperia.

Diano Arentino borders the following municipalities: Chiusanico, Diano Castello, Diano San Pietro, Imperia, Pontedassio, and Stellanello.

Demographic evolution

See also 
 San Pietro (creek)

References

Cities and towns in Liguria